Elachista stenopterella is a moth of the family Elachistidae. It is found in Albania.

References

stenopterella
Moths described in 1932
Moths of Europe